Oxyhammus zanguebaricus is a species of beetle in the family Cerambycidae. It was described by Stephan von Breuning in 1961. It is known from Tanzania and Malawi.

References

Lamiini
Beetles described in 1961